The 2023 Rhode Island Rams football team will represent the University of Rhode Island as a member of the Colonial Athletic Association (CAA) during the 2023 NCAA Division I FCS football season. The Rams, led by 10th-year head coach Jim Fleming, will play their home games at Meade Stadium.

Previous season

The Rams finished the 2022 season with a record of 7–4 (5–3 in the CAA). They finished in fifth place. Rhode Island started the season unranked, but climbed as high as No. 17 after a 2–0 start by week three. Rhode Island would drop off the rankings in week five after losing back-to-back against No. 9 Delaware and No. 24 (FBS) Pittsburgh. They would come back into the rankings in week six at No. T-25, but they dropped off the rankings again at the end of the season.

The team finished the 2022 season unranked.

Offseason

Team departures

Transfer portal

Outgoing transfers
Two Rhode Island Rams players via NCAA Transfer Portal during or after the 2022 season.

Incoming transfers
Over the off-season, Rhode Island added five players via transfer portal.

Recruiting class

Rhode Island signed seventeen players in the class of 2023.

Schedule

Game summaries

at Georgia State

Stony Brook

Maine

at Villanova

Bryant

at Brown

Richmond

at Albany

New Hampshire

North Carolina A&T

at Towson

Rankings

Personnel

Coaching staff

Roster

Statistics

Team

Individual leaders

Defense

Key: POS: Position, SOLO: Solo Tackles, AST: Assisted Tackles, TOT: Total Tackles, TFL: Tackles-for-loss, SACK: Quarterback Sacks, INT: Interceptions, BU: Passes Broken Up, PD: Passes Defended, QBH: Quarterback Hits, FR: Fumbles Recovered, FF: Forced Fumbles, BLK: Kicks or Punts Blocked, SAF: Safeties, TD : Touchdown

Special teams

References

Rhode Island
Rhode Island Rams football seasons
Rhode Island Rams football